Galinsoga subdiscoidea is a rare Mexican species of flowering plant in the family Asteraceae. It has been found only in the State of Durango in northern Mexico.

Description
Each head has about 5 white ray flowers surrounding a large number of yellow disc flowers.

References

subdiscoidea
Flora of Durango
Plants described in 1965
Taxa named by Arthur Cronquist